This is a list of the 22 members of the European Parliament for Hungary in the 2009 to 2014 session.

List

Party representation

See also
 Members of the European Parliament 2009–14 – List by country
 List of members of the European Parliament, 2009–14 – Full alphabetical list
 2009 European Parliament election in Hungary
 2009 European Parliament election
 Parliamentary Groups

Notes

Hungary
2009
List